Willies may refer to:

 Willies, Nord, a commune in the Nord department in northern France
 The Willies, a 2002 album by Bill Frisell
 The Willies (film), a 1990 American comedy/horror anthology
 Willies Ice Cream, a company in Trinidad and Tobago
 Willies Mchunu, South African politician

See also
 Willys, a U.S. brand of car
 Willy (disambiguation)